The Independence Day of Armenia (Armenian: Հայաստանի Անկախության օրը) is the main state holiday in Armenia. This date is celebrated on September 21.

History 
On August 23, 1990, Supreme Council adopted the Declaration of State Sovereignty of Armenia proclaiming the Armenian SSR abolished and the establishment of the Republic of Armenia. Armenia refused to sign the New Union Treaty. After the failed August putsuch, the people of Armenia voted in a referendum to proclaim independence from the Soviet Union on September 21, 1991. Levon Ter-Petrosyan was elected the first president of Armenia in November 1991. On December 21, 1991, Armenia joined the Commonwealth of Independent States (CIS). Armenia gained independence formally on December 26 in connection with the dissolution of the USSR.

This is the second declaration of independence in modern Armenian history, the first having occurred on May 28, 1918 which led to the formation of the First Republic of Armenia. This First Armenian Republic was short-lived due to its partition by the Russian Soviet Federative Socialist Republic and Turkish Nationalist forces in late 1920.

Celebratory events 

The following celebratory events are held on Independence Day one way or the other:

 A national awards ceremony of the President of Armenia for honouring military veterans and honoured citizens.
 Historical events held at primary and secondary schools in Armenia.
 Special programs in honour of the History of Armenia.
 An armed forces exhibition is opened to the public.
 Concerts at public squares in Yerevan.

During a ceremony in honor of Gyumri's City Day, Armenian Prime Minister Nikol Pashinyan announced a new tradition to hold national celebrations in different parts of the country, starting with Gyumri in 2019. In 2020, a revised ceremony took place at Victory Park, during which Sukhoi Su-30 fighters performed a flyover in a finger-four formation above the park's eternal flame.

Independence Day military parade 

Military parades celebrating the independence of Armenia have been held on Republic Square in Yerevan in 1992, 1996, 1999, 2006, 2011, and 2016.

The celebrations begin as the parade commander (Usually the Chief of the General Staff of the Armed Forces with a billet of a Lieutenant General or Colonel General) arrives on Republic Square to receive the report from the Commandant of the Vazgen Sargsyan Military University on the readiness of the troops participating in the parade. At 10 am, the President and the Prime Minister arrives as the parade commander orders the parade to present arms for the Defence minister of Armenia. The parade commander then is driven on a Nissan Patrol SUV to the center of the square to inform the defense minister that the parade is now ready for inspection. The minister then inspects the parade contingents and congratulates them on the holiday. At the conclusion of the inspection, the minister approaches the president on the tribune and says "Mr/Madam President, the troops of the Armed Forces of Armenia participating in the parade in honor of the anniversary of the independence of the Republic of Armenia, are ready for the parade to march past". After the minister finishes their report to the president, the parade commander orders the parade to stand at ease, to where the Presidential Fanfare is then sounded, and the president then delivers a holiday address to the assembled formations.

The referendum of 1991 also included the Armenian population of Artsakh voting for independence from the Soviet Union. With the population being 99% Armenian both historically and during the 1991 referendum, there was a unanimous decision to be recognized as an independent republic. 

At the conclusion of the address, the parade formations shout a threefold Oorah, followed by the playing of Mer Hayrenik by the massed bands of the general staff. The parade is then ordered to prepare for the march past, with armed linemen and markers from the Honour Guard of the Ministry of Defense of Armenia marching to their post in front of the central tribune to provide the security for the march past. The parade commander then orders the parade to march past the saluting base with the Corps of Drums from the Monte Melkonian Military College setting the pace of the parade led by its drum major, followed by the national colour guard and then the parade contingents. As the Corps of Drums marches past the grandstand, the drum major executes eyes right as the drummers swing their sticks. The parades includes personnel from the Armenak Khanperyants Military Aviation University, the Military Police, the 12th Peacekeeping Brigade, the Armenian Border Guard, and veterans of the Nagorno Karabakh Defense Army.

1996 
The parade in 1996 celebrated the 5th anniversary of independence. It coincided with the 1996 Armenian presidential election, which would take place the day after. The opposition charged President Levon Ter-Petrosyan, who was in attendance, with putting on a show of force to his opposition and particularly supporters of his opponent Vazgen Manukyan.

1999 
The 1999 parade that celebrated the 8th anniversary of independence was commanded by Major General Manvel Grigoryan and inspected by Lieutenant General Vagharshak Harutiunyan. New rocket systems were seen among the military hardware seen. Many questioned the wisdom of spending public funds for the parade while others were enthusiastic, with an Armenian-American described the parade as "beautiful to see" and as a demonstration of an "ability to take care of ourselves and not to be massacred as we have in our history".

2006 
2006 celebrated the 15th anniversary of Armenia's independence. The parade began with Defense Minister Serzh Sargsyan, and Chief of Staff Mikael Harutyunyan inspecting the troops congratulating them on the holiday. This was the first time the parade speech was given by the President of Armenia.

2011 
Armenia celebrated its 20th anniversary in 2011. Inspecting the parade was Minister of Defence Seyran Ohanyan, and the Chief of the General Staff Colonel General Yuri Khatchaturov. A group representing the Russian Army's 102nd Military Base in Armenia took part in the parade alongside Armenian troops for the first time. The Krunk UAV was demonstrated for the first time at the parade.

2016 
Armenia's 25th anniversary parade in 2016 was the biggest celebration in Armenia's history. Commanding the parade was Major General Andranik Makaryan, the commander of the Joint-Forces. More than 350,000 people were spectators and participants of the events. Among the new participants were students of Small Mher School and the youth wing of the Yerkrapah. An international peace brigade carrying the flags of the United States, Germany, Italy, Poland and Greece took part in the parade. Several Russian-made weapons were on display, the most important of which were 9K720 Iskander. A dozen MiG-29 fighter jets from Russian and Armenian Su-25 attack aircraft flew overhead.

The parade also saw the introduction of the posting of the Flag of Armenia, the flag of the Ministry of Defence, and the flag of King Ashot II the Iron before the parade proceedings. The flag-bearing group was headed by Major-General Ishkhan Matosyan. Also before the start of the military parade, was the head of the military clergy, Bishop Vrtanes Abrahamyan, reading the "Lord's Prayer".

Diaspora celebrations 
Independence day celebrations are also held in diaspora countries such as Russia, Lebanon and the United States. In the United States specifically, Armenian-American youth organizations hold rallies and cultural programs on this day. The Armenian Independence Day Festival in Los Angeles's Little Armenia was established in 1998, attracting around 5,000 spectators on Independence Day. In 2019, Prime Minister Pashinyan visited the city during the Independence Day celebrations, the first visit of its kind. On the holiday in 2020, the personal star of singer Arman Hovhannisyan was be installed on the Walk of Fame in Las Vegas. That same year in Lebanon, Aram I (head of the Catholicosate of the Great House of Cilicia) led the divine liturgy and ceremonial flag blessing in Antelias. Also on the holiday in 2020, the Mayor of Washington, D.C., Muriel Bowser proclaimed September the 21st as “Armenian Independence Day” in the United States capital city.

Places lit in Armenian symbols on Independence Day

Flag of Armenia 
 Niagara Falls (2020)
 Ottawa City Hall (2020)
 Burj Khalifa (2020)
 Tbilisi TV Broadcasting Tower (2020)
 Abu Dhabi National Oil Company Tower (2020)
 Jack House Ukraine (2020)
 Nur-Sultan City Centre (2020)
 Cafe't Wapen van Drenthe, Assen (2020)
 De Pijp, Groningen (2020)
 Radisson Montevideo Victoria Plaza Hotel (2020)
 Argentina National Flag Memorial (2020)
 Bicentennial Lighthouse (2020)
 Galileo Galilei Planetarium (2020)
 Cairo Tower (2021)

Other 
 Christ the Redeemer (lit with the Armenian alphabet, 2020)
 Google Doodle (the 21 September 2020 Google Doodle was dedicated to Armenia’s Independence Day, illustrated in the Doodle artwork is Armenia’s red-blue-and-orange flag)

Controversy with some celebrations 
In early September 2021, the government announced plans for celebrations of the 30th anniversary independence on a large scale. These plans were criticized by the public, with many, including family members of soldiers killed in the 2020 Nagorno-Karabakh War, deeming it as inappropriate considering Armenia's defeat in that war. Many opposed to these plans proposed a gathering at Yerablur on 21 September.

Gallery

See also 
 List of national independence days
 Public holidays in Armenia
 Shushi Liberation Day

References

External links 

 Armenian Independence Day Celebrations, 2011
 Armenian Independence Day Celebrations, 2016
 Վարչապետ Նիկոլ Փաշինյանի ուղերձը ՀՀ անկախության 27-ամյակի առթիվ
 Armenian Prime Minister Nikol Pashinyan Makes First Appearance in Los Angeles Pt 2

September observances
Armenia
1991 establishments in Armenia
Annual events in Armenia
Public holidays in Armenia
Autumn events in Armenia